John George (born 22 March 1961) is a Cornish mobile phone entrepreneur and race car driver, best known for driving in the British Touring Car Championship.

Racing career

Early years
He raced in the Elf Clio Renaultsport UK Cup for Mardi Gras in 2002 and 2003, without much success. He also did some EERC Endurance races for them in 2003/2004 winning the saloon car class. He also did Britcar in 2005 winning his class in the Britcar/Silverstone 24hr and coming 2nd in 2006.

British Touring Car Championship

Mardi Gras Motorsport (2004)

George made his British Touring Car Championship debut in 2004, his entry for Mardi Gras was notable as the first car to use Liquefied petroleum gas (LPG) fuel. He drove both a Honda Civic Type-R and a Peugeot 406 during the season. A 2005 ride for Vic Lee Racing fell through when Lee was jailed for drug-dealing.

TH Motorsport (2007–2009)
In 2007 he returned to the BTCC claiming the TH Motorsport team's first ever BTCC points, with a top finish of 8th, and two pole starts in the reverse grid format, driving an ex-Matt Neal Honda Integra for the TH Motorsport team.

The Integra was becoming outdated by 2008, and with only one point, George finished 21st in the championship. His season ended with a spectacular crash during the final round at Brands Hatch. George was battling with Darren Turner as they approached Surtees for the first time. Turner made contact with the rear of George's Integra and it cannoned off into the barriers which launched the car into a series of rolls, before landing on its side. He suffered bruising but no broken bones, but spent 2 nights in hospital as a precaution.

He struggled in the 2009 season, finishing 25th in the championship for TH Motorsport.

Tech-Speed Motorsport (2010–2011)
He has moved to the Tech-Speed Motorsport team for 2010 and finished 13th in the Independent championship in what he has described as his most competitive season alongside team-mate Paul O'Neill. His best result was a ninth place at the opening race at Thruxton, however the team and George both expressed hopes that they would be back out for 2011 and realise a potential for more points-scoring finishes.

George stayed alongside O'Neill in 2011, driving an ex–Silverline Chevrolet Super 2000 Chevrolet Cruze. He collided with one of the barriers at Croft and tore the tendons in his right hand. He was able to participate in the following round at Snetterton while on painkillers and was fully healed by the time of the Knockhill round. Despite not scoring points in the main drivers' championship, he scored five points in the independents' trophy to finish the season 22nd in class.

He is coached by John Pratt, who has previously worked with Andy Priaulx.

Personal life
George was head of JAG Communications, an independent mobile phone retailer. He has been active in the UK mobile phone industry since its early days. He also competed successfully in pistol shooting before it was banned in the UK. He is married to Sue, and has a daughter Kailey and son Kevin, plus grand daughters Katelyn, Holly and grandson Leam. He is teetotal and lives in Guernsey.

He is also a keen aviator and currently owns Perranporth airfield in Cornwall as well as flying most days in his Cessna Citation Mustang light jet based in Guernsey and also holding an American ATP jet rating. In February 2013, George put Perranporth airfield on the market for an asking price of £1.5million.
In September 2019 George legally changed.

Racing record

Complete British Touring Car Championship results
(key) (Races in bold indicate pole position – 1 point awarded in first race) (Races in italics indicate fastest lap – 1 point awarded all races) (* signifies that driver lead race for at least one lap – 1 point awarded all races)

Britcar 24 Hour results

References

External links
Interview before 2007, mentioning past seasons
Profile at BTCCPages.com
Career statistics

Living people
1961 births
English racing drivers
British Touring Car Championship drivers
Guernsey people
Britcar 24-hour drivers
Renault UK Clio Cup drivers